The Division of Lindsay is an Australian electoral division in the state of New South Wales.

Ever since Lindsay was first contested at the 1984 federal election the seat had always elected a member of the government of the day − a pattern known as a "bellwether" seat. However, Lindsay's bellwether run ended at the 2016 federal election when Labor's Emma Husar defeated one-term Liberal Fiona Scott.

History

The division is named after Norman Lindsay, the prominent Australian artist, writer and sculptor. The division was proclaimed at the redistribution of 11 October 1984 and was first contested at the 1984 federal election.

The Division of Lindsay has bellwether status. The 2016 federal election is the only instance where the member to win the seat has not been from the party to form government. This has been widely attributed to Lindsay's buildup as an economically sensitive seat. The mortgage belt status of the electorate means fiscal matters such as interest rates, job security, petrol prices and quality of transportation are always critical issues at federal elections. The geographic buildup of the seat consists of Liberal voting areas in the west, Labor voting areas in the east and swing areas in the centre.

Prior to the 1996 election, it was considered a safe Labor seat, as it was located in Labor's longstanding heartland of west Sydney. This ended in 1996, when then member Ross Free was thrown from office by Liberal challenger Jackie Kelly on a swing of nearly 12 percent. Free was one of 13 New South Wales Labor MPs to lose their seats in Labor's heavy defeat that year. However a by-election was called when it was revealed that questions about Kelly's citizenship raised eligibility problems. Kelly won the subsequent by-election with an additional 6.69% swing towards her.

Kelly announced her retirement in 2007 which, together with the 2006 redistribution, made Lindsay vulnerable to the Labor candidate, Penrith Mayor David Bradbury. In his third bid for the seat, Bradbury won with a swing of 9.7% after distribution of preferences, defeating the unsuccessful Liberal candidate Karen Chijoff. Three days before the 2007 federal election Liberal Party supporters, including Jackie Kelly's husband, were caught in Lindsay distributing fake pamphlets in residents' letterboxes which linked the Labor Party to Islamic terrorism. For more details see Lindsay pamphlet scandal. Bradbury narrowly retained the seat in 2010 against Liberal Fiona Scott, but she defeated him at the 2013 election receiving a favourable swing towards her in both elections of 5.16% in 2010 and 4.11% in 2013.

However, the bellwether streak ended at the 2016 federal election as Labor's Emma Husar defeated Scott to claim the seat, while overall the Liberal/National coalition narrowly retained government.

Boundaries
Since 1984, federal electoral division boundaries in Australia have been determined at redistributions by a redistribution committee appointed by the Australian Electoral Commission. Redistributions occur for the boundaries of divisions in a particular state, and they occur every seven years, or sooner if a state's representation entitlement changes or when divisions of a state are malapportioned.

The division is located in the outer western suburbs of Sydney, and is centred on Penrith. It also includes the suburbs of Berkshire Park, Cambridge Gardens, Cambridge Park, Castlereagh, Claremont Meadows, Colyton, Cranebrook, Dunheved, Emu Heights, Emu Plains, Glenmore Park, Jamisontown, Jordan Springs, Kingswood, Kingswood Park, Lemongrove, Leonay, Llandilo, Londonderry, Mount Pleasant, North St Marys, Oxley Park, Regentville, South Penrith, St Marys, Werrington, Werrington County, and Werrington Downs; as well as parts of Agnes Banks, Badgerys Creek, Luddenham, Mulgoa, and Orchard Hills.

Members

Election results

References

External links
 Division of Lindsay – Australian Electoral Commission

Electoral divisions of Australia
Constituencies established in 1984
1984 establishments in Australia
Norman Lindsay